Cophixalus shellyi is a species of frog in the family Microhylidae. It is endemic to Papua New Guinea and occurs in the New Guinea Highlands as well as in the Adelbert Range and on the Huon Peninsula. The specific name shellyi honors Father Otto Schellenberger ("Shelly"), an American missionary and former professor in mathematics who collected the type series.

Common names
The common name Shelly's rainforest frog has been coined for this species.

It is known as gwnm sbmganpygak in the Kalam language of Papua New Guinea.

Description
The snout is obtusely pointed. The tympanum is very indistinct, and the supratympanic fold is very faint. The legs are relatively long. The fingers and toes bear discs that are relatively small. The first finger is very short and bears no distinctly enlarged disc. Preserved specimens are grayish brown dorsally. The side of the head is black. A faint, light mid-vertebral line may be present.

Habitat and conservation
Specimens have also been found in landslides, rockslides, and rocky areas. Development is presumably direct (i.e., no free-living larval stage).

It is a locally common species that is not facing known threats. It is not known from protected areas.

References

shellyi
Endemic fauna of New Guinea
Endemic fauna of Papua New Guinea
Amphibians of Papua New Guinea
Amphibians described in 1956
Taxa named by Richard G. Zweifel
Taxonomy articles created by Polbot